Armen may refer to:

 the Armani, a tribe of the Armenian Highlands and Anatolia
 sometimes associated with the Name of Armenia
Armen (name), including a list of people with the name

Places
Armen, Albania, a town in southern Albania
Ar Men ("the rock" in Breton), a lighthouse at one end of the Chaussée de l'Île de Sein, at the west end of Brittany

See also
Armin (name)
Armine